Criticize or Criticise may refer to:

 Criticize, the action of criticism
 "Criticize" (song), a 1987 Alexander O'Neal song